Emil Heineman (born 16 November 2001) is a Swedish professional ice hockey left winger who plays for the Laval Rocket in the American Hockey League (AHL) as a prospect of the Montreal Canadiens in the National Hockey League (NHL).

Playing career
Heineman made his SHL debut with Leksands IF during the 2019–20 SHL season. He was drafted by the Florida Panthers in the second round of the 2020 NHL Entry Draft with the 43rd overall pick.

During his second season in the SHL with Leksands in 2020–21, on 12 April 2021, his NHL rights were traded by the Panthers along with a second-round draft selection in 2022 to the Calgary Flames in exchange for Sam Bennett and a sixth-round pick in 2022.

In the following 2021–22 season while with Leksands, Heineman's NHL rights were included in a trade package by the Flames along with Tyler Pitlick and draft picks to the Montreal Canadiens in exchange for Tyler Toffoli on 14 February 2022. In his first full season in the SHL, Heineman appeared in 38 regular season games, registering a career best 11 goals and 16 points. At the conclusion of his season with Leksands, Heineman was signed by the Canadiens to a three-year, entry-level contract commencing in the  season on 4 April 2022. He was assigned on a professional try-out to join AHL affiliate, the Laval Rocket, for the remainder of the season.

Career statistics

Regular season and playoffs

International

References

External links

2001 births
Living people
Florida Panthers draft picks
Leksands IF players
People from Leksand Municipality
Swedish ice hockey left wingers
Sportspeople from Dalarna County